Rudolf Goerz (sometimes spelled Rudolph) (born 1879 and died 1935) was a German botanist.

He was particularly interested in spermatophytes.

References 

German taxonomists
20th-century German botanists
1879 births
1935 deaths